The 2010–11 Liga Nacional de Ascenso de Honduras season is the 32nd season of the Liga Nacional de Ascenso de Honduras, the second division of football in Honduras. It is contested by 28 teams split into two zones with two divisions each.

The season is split into two separate competitions, the Apertura and the Clausura. After the end of the Clausura, the winners of both competitions will face off against each other in order to determine the team which will earn promotion to the Liga Nacional de Fútbol de Honduras for the 2011–12 season.

2010–11 teams

Apertura

Regular season

Final round

Quarterfinals

Colinas vs Parrillas One

 Parrillas One advanced 4–1 on aggregated score.

Atlético Olanchano vs Yoro

 Yoro advanced 3–0 on aggregated score.

Atlético Municipal vs Juticalpa

 Atlético Municipal advanced 4–3 on aggregated score.

Sonaguera vs Atlético Esperanzano

 Atlético Esperanzano advanced 5–2 on aggregated score.

Semifinals

Atlético Esperanzano vs Parrillas One

 Parrillas One advanced 3–1 on aggregated score.

Atlético Municipal vs Yoro

 Yoro advanced 4–3 on aggregated score.

Final

Yoro vs Parrillas One

 Parrillas One won 3–2 on aggregated score.

Clausura

Regular season

Group A North

Group B North

Group A Central

Group B Central

Final round

Quarterfinals

Real Sociedad vs Atlético Esperanzano

 Real Sociedad advanced 3–0 on aggregate score.

Atlético Choloma vs Juticalpa

 Atlético Choloma advanced 1–0 on aggregate score.

Valencia vs Yoro

 Yoro advanced 7–2 on aggregate score.

UPNFM vs Atlético Municipal

 Atlético Municipal advanced 3–2 on aggregate score.

Semifinals

Atlético Choloma vs Yoro

 Atlético Choloma 3–3 Yoro on aggregate score; Atlético Choloma won 4–1 on penalty shootouts.

Real Sociedad vs Atlético Municipal

 Real Sociedad won 3–2 on aggregate score.

Final

Real Sociedad vs Atlético Choloma

 Real Sociedad 3–3 Atlético Choloma on aggregate score; Atlético Choloma won 5–4 on penalty shootouts.

Promotion
To be played between Parrillas One and Atlético Choloma, winners of Apertura and Clausura tournaments respectively.

Final

Atlético Choloma vs Parrillas One 

 Atlético Choloma won 2–1 on aggregate score.

2010–11 in Honduran football
Hon
Honduran Liga Nacional de Ascenso seasons